Anno Schreier (born 1979 Aachen) is a German composer.

Works
 Der Herr Gevatter (2004).
 Kein Ort. Nirgends (2006). Opera after Christa Wolf.
 Wunderhorn (2008). Song cycle
 Hinter Masken (2008)
 Die Stadt der Blinden (2011). Opera after the novel by José Saramago.
 Hamlet (2016). Premiere at Theater an der Wien 
 Schade, dass sie eine Hure war (2016–2018). Opera after John Ford.

References

Living people
1979 births